Pugsley Buzzard Wateringcan is an Australian musician and actor.

Life 
Buzzard comes from a musical family in which he was early influenced to sing and play the piano. But he just took the decision to work as professional musician, after he visited his sister, while she was living in Italy. She made a contact to a Jazz-Club in which he got a job as opener. He decided to make this to his regular job and founded the 'Pugsley Buzzard Trio', in which he plays piano and sings, together with a drummer and a guitarist. As actor he starred in the movie Fags in the Fast Lane, in the TV-Show True Story with Hamish & Andy and several other films and television shows. He currently lives in Berlin.

Discography

Albums

Awards and nominations

Music Victoria Awards
The Music Victoria Awards are an annual awards night celebrating Victorian music. They commenced in 2006.

! 
|-
| Music Victoria Awards of 2016
| Skin and Teeth
| Best Blues Album
| 
|rowspan="1"| 
|-

References

External links
 Homepage
 Pugsley Buzzard on Discogs
 

Australian jazz musicians
Living people
Year of birth missing (living people)